Livške Ravne is a small settlement above Livek in the Municipality of Kobarid in the Littoral region of Slovenia.

References

External links
Livške Ravne on Geopedia

Populated places in the Municipality of Kobarid